Stow–Munroe Falls High School (SMFHS) is a public high school in Stow, Ohio, United States. In the 2014–15 school year, the school had an enrollment of approximately 1,650 students and a staff of more than 160. It is the only high school in the Stow–Munroe Falls City School District and serves students in grades nine through twelve, mostly from the cities of Stow and Munroe Falls, but also neighboring parts of Cuyahoga Falls, Franklin Township, Hudson, and Tallmadge. In recent years, academic recognition has come from the Ohio Department of Education, Newsweek, and U.S. News & World Report.

Established in 1907, Stow High School (SHS) graduated its first class in 1909. The school has operated at four different sites, all of which lie within roughly a  stretch along Graham Road in Stow. The first dedicated high school building opened in 1924, followed by a new facility in 1963. During most of the 1970s and 1980s, classes were held on two separate sites to relieve overcrowding. The current building was opened in 1987 and the school was officially renamed Stow–Munroe Falls High School in 1991.

Academically, SMFHS offers dozens of courses, including 16 Advanced Placement classes. Many vocational education programs are available through the Six District Educational Compact with neighboring high schools. In addition, clubs and activities are offered in a number of different areas, including the visual and performing arts, foreign languages, speech and debate, science and social causes. Athletic teams are known as the Bulldogs and the school colors are maroon and gold. SMFHS competes in the Ohio High School Athletic Association as a member of the Suburban League. Notable alumni include figures in the entertainment industry, broadcast media, and professional sports.

History

Stow High School was established in 1907 with classes held at the new centralized school building at the northwest corner of Hudson Road (later Darrow Road) and Graham Road in Stow. Early classes were much smaller than they are today; as such, the first class did not graduate until 1909, and there was no class of 1915. The school received full accreditation in 1914 and the village of Munroe Falls joined the school district in 1916. Enrollment growth necessitated construction of a separate high school building, which opened in 1924 across the street at the southwest corner of Darrow and Graham Roads. This structure was later renamed in 1968 for Velma Workman, who retired in 1967 after teaching in the Stow schools for 37 years. This building, known as the Lakeview building, opened in 1963 as "Stow Senior High School".

Even with the opening of the new Kimpton Junior High School in 1970, overcrowding continued to be an issue. To alleviate the problem, grades nine and ten were sent back to the Workman building in 1971, which became known as Workman High School, while grades eleven and twelve remained at Lakeview. This setup remained in place until the current facility opened in 1987. The name of the school was officially changed to Stow–Munroe Falls High School in 1991. Commencement for the high school's 100th graduating class (2009) was held at E. J. Thomas Hall in downtown Akron, long the traditional venue. In 2013, commencement was moved to the Memorial Athletic and Convocation Center in Kent.

Academics
Stow–Munroe Falls High School offers a broad curriculum designed for students with varying strengths and interests, from college preparatory to intensive career-technical.  College bound students opting for a more rigorous schedule may select from 16 Advanced Placement (AP) courses: Art History; Biology; Calculus; Chemistry; Computer Science; English Language; English Literature; European History; Macroeconomics/Microeconomics (combined); Physics; Spanish Language; Statistics; Studio Art Drawing; Studio Art 2D Design; U.S. Government; and U.S. History.  Although no AP course is offered in Music Theory, students enrolled in Music Theory 2 do have the option of taking the AP test.  The high school is also part of the Six District Educational Compact, a joint program of six area school districts (Cuyahoga Falls, Hudson, Kent, Stow-Munroe Falls, Tallmadge and Woodridge) which share access to each of their vocational training facilities and career resources.

Activities
The high school offers numerous clubs, activities and programs for students to participate in beyond the classroom: AFS Intercultural Programs; American Civics Center (ACC); Business Professionals of America (BPA); Freshman, Sophomore, Junior and Senior Class Executive Committees; Chess Club; Cooperative Business Education (CBE); DECA; Environmentally Concerned Students (ECS); Foreign Language clubs including French, German, Japanese and Spanish; Interact of Rotary International; Key Club; National Honor Society (NHS); Ohio Math League; Photography Club; Quill and Scroll; Science Olympiad; Ski Club; Spectrum, a literary and creative arts magazine; Stoanno, the school yearbook; Stohion, the school newspaper; Stow Student News (television broadcast news); Students Against Destructive Decisions (SADD); Student Council; Teambackers; and Work Study Club.

The Stow–Munroe Falls High School Academic Challenge team is the school's quizbowl team, actively competing in Academic Challenge, National Academic Quiz Tournaments (NAQT) and the Partnership for Academic Competition Excellence (PACE). During the 2008–09 school year, Stow-Munroe Falls placed 4th in the state as part of NAQT; the team's leading scorer ranked 1st individually at the national level (also NAQT); and the team placed 6th at the 2009 PACE National Scholastics Championship (NSC). The Stow–Munroe Falls High School Speech and Debate team competes in the Eastern Ohio district of the National Forensic League (NFL) and the Akron District of the Ohio High School Speech League (OHSSL). The team has won state titles in 4-Person Policy Debate (1994, 1998), Lincoln-Douglas Debate (2001), and Public Forum Debate (2009). Since 1994, Stow has sent at least eleven students to the NFL National Tournament. The Stow Latin Club – formerly a local chapter of both the Ohio Junior Classical League (OJCL) and the National Junior Classical League (NJCL) – won 28 consecutive state championships, or Overall Sweepstakes trophies, at the annual OJCL State Convention from 1979 to 2006. Additionally, club members frequently attended and competed at the NJCL National Convention.

The Stow-Munroe Falls City School District was nationally recognized by the NAMM Foundation as one of the "Best Communities for Music Education" in 2009 and 2010, while the high school itself was recognized in 2012.  SMFHS offers courses in music theory, as well as a variety of opportunities to participate in both vocal and instrumental music: the school orchestra, choir and band programs; Madrigals, an a cappella choral group; and the Notables show choir.  In addition to offering a Drama Club, Stow–Munroe Falls High School presents several theatrical productions each year: a one-act play festival, the Junior and Senior Class Plays (drama and comedy, respectively), murder mysteries, a children’s theater and the All-School Musical.  Theater participants may also qualify for induction into the International Thespian Society (ITS).

With more than 250 students participating for the 2019–20 school year, the band program is the largest organization at Stow–Munroe Falls High School. The Bulldog Marching Band performs during football games in the fall, and at season's end, members are placed into one of four concert bands: the Freshmen Concert Band, the Maroon Symphonic Band, the Gold Symphonic Band, or the Wind Ensemble.  Additionally, a jazz program consisting of three jazz bands – Jazz 1, Jazz 2, and Jazz Lab – is offered as an extracurricular activity.  Bands and band members also compete at Ohio Music Education Association (OMEA) adjudicated events, often receiving superior ratings.  The Bulldog Marching Band has twice won the AAA-class competition at the Gator Bowl in Jacksonville, Florida: first in December 1991, then in January 1996.  In 2000, the Wind Ensemble performed for the OMEA State Professional Convention, one of three high school bands selected out of 200 statewide through a blind audition.

Athletics

Stow–Munroe Falls High School is a member of the Northeast District of the Ohio High School Athletic Association (OHSAA).  Known as the Bulldogs, Stow's 28 varsity athletic teams compete in the Suburban League National Division: baseball, cheerleading (fall and winter), field hockey, football, gymnastics, softball, and wrestling; and separate boys and girls teams for basketball, bowling, cross country, golf, lacrosse, soccer, swimming and diving, tennis, track and field, and volleyball.  Before the 2015–16 school year, Stow was a member of the Northeast Ohio Conference (2007–15), the Western Reserve Conference (1996–2007) and the Metro League (1936–96).  The Cuyahoga Falls Black Tigers are considered Stow's archrival; other SMFHS rivals include the Hudson Explorers and the Kent Roosevelt Rough Riders.  Most teams play home matches at Stow–Munroe Falls High School, while the swimming and diving teams hold meets at Akron General Health and Wellness Center North in Stow.

Stow-Munroe Falls won its last state title in 2017 when girls bowling beat Troy High School in three Baker games at Wayne Webb's Columbus Bowl.  The last state title won by a boys team occurred in 2006 when boys soccer defeated Fairfield High School in a shootout match at Columbus Crew Stadium.  Girls volleyball last won a state title in 1992, though remains the athletic program's most accomplished team sport: tied for 3rd place statewide for most wins in a season (30-0, 1981); 9th place statewide for most wins all-time (583, 1971–2009); tied for 5th place for most state tournament appearances at 11 (1975–76, 1979–81, 1986, 1989–90, 1992, 1997, 2009); a school-record 28 conference championships; and four state titles in 18 seasons of play.

Stow boys basketball has never won a state title, but was considered one of the nation's most competitive squads in the early 1990s.  Teams from both 1990 and 1993 advanced to the state final four, the Associated Press ranked Stow #1 in its final state poll for the 1992–93 season, and USA Today repeatedly ranked the teams from the 1992–93 and 1993–94 seasons among the nation's top ten.  The girls basketball team finished second in the state in 2007, and girls lacrosse was the Division II state runner-up in 2006 (the majority of Stow teams compete in Division I).  In 1996, the baseball team advanced to the state final four, as did boys volleyball in 2001.

Notable alumni
Haley Bennett (2005, attended only) - singer, songwriter, and actress
Richard Cooey (1985) - convicted murderer and rapist; executed in 2008
Ed Donatell (1975) - NFL assistant coach
Lee Gissendaner (1990) - player personal executive for the Green Bay Packers
Jim Graner (1937) - weeknight sports anchor for WKYC/Cleveland; color analyst for Cleveland Browns Radio Network
Dave Jamerson (1985) - 1st-round pick and 15th-overall selection of 1990 NBA Draft
John Magaro (2001) - film and television actor
Shawn Porter (2006) - professional boxer; World Boxing Council (WBC) welterweight champion
Erick Purkhiser (1964) - better known as Lux Interior, lead singer and founding member of The Cramps; pioneer of psychobilly subgenre
David Walker (2012) - professional basketball player in Liga ACB
Chris Young (1999) - pitching coach in Major League Baseball (MLB)
Jok Church (1967)- creator of the comic You Can With Beakman and Jax the TV show Beakman's World

References

External links

1907 establishments in Ohio
Educational institutions established in 1907
Public high schools in Ohio
High schools in Summit County, Ohio